Arab-Norman Palermo and the Cathedral Churches of Cefalù and Monreale is a series of nine religious and civic structures located on the northern coast of Sicily dating from the era of the Norman Kingdom of Sicily (1130-1194): two palaces, three churches, a cathedral, and a bridge in Palermo, as well as the cathedrals of Cefalù and Monreale. They have been designated together as a UNESCO World Heritage Site. This dedication took place in 2015.

The new Norman rulers built various structures in what has become known as the Arab-Norman style. They incorporated the best practices of Arab and Byzantine architecture into their own art. Although a different builder constructed each of the sites, they are linked together because of their shared architecture and time period. These sites work to create a shared identity among the areas that they are built in. This is because many people chose to visit the sites together, not just one at a time. Providing not only a steady revenue of tourism, but also a revenue of tourists that have visited each of the sites and bring that experience with them. 

Currently all of the buildings are under continuous restoration and care. This care varies from site to site but most often consists of topical restoration (cleaning, maintaining murals, etc), research (what the building might have looked like originally and what was done there), and structural restoration (making sure the building is safe and structurally sound).

Structures

References

 
Tourist attractions in Palermo
Monreale
World Heritage Sites in Italy
Norman architecture in Italy
Churches with Norman architecture
Cefalù